Tharoorosaurus is a book by Shashi Tharoor which was published on 1 September 2020 by Penguin Random House.

Composition 
The book is written in style of thesaurus and the definition of the book is ‘Aptagrams’. Shashi Tharoor shares 53 examples from his vocabulary which all are introduced by him.

Critical reviews 
K. C. Vijaya Kumar of The Hindu wrote:  
The Times of India wrote: 
The book has been also reviewed by Ajay Kumar Singh of Daily Pioneer, and Gaurav Prakash of The News Agency.

References 

Thesauri
Books by Shashi Tharoor
2020 non-fiction books
Penguin Random House